Wilcutt is a surname. Notable people with the surname include: 

D. C. Wilcutt (1923–2015), American basketball player
Terrence W. Wilcutt (born 1949), US Marine Corps officer and NASA astronaut

See also
Walcutt